Elspeth Barker (16 November 1940 – 21 April 2022) was a Scottish novelist and journalist. 

Born as Elspeth Langlands, she was raised in Drumtochty Castle, Aberdeenshire, Scotland, where her parents ran a prep school for boys. From 1958, she read Literae Humaniores (Classics) at Somerville College, Oxford. Barker's only novel, O Caledonia, was published in 1991. It won four awards and was shortlisted for the Whitbread Prize. Her edited anthology Loss, about bereavement, was published in 1997, and her reviews and essays in a 2012 collection, Dog Days.

Her first husband was the poet George Barker by whom she had five children, including the novelist Raffaella Barker. In 2007, she married the writer Bill Troop. Barker died at her home in Aylsham on 21 April 2022, aged 81, from health issues following a stroke.

References

1940 births
2022 deaths
20th-century British novelists
20th-century British women writers
Alumni of Somerville College, Oxford
People associated with Norwich University of the Arts
People educated at Drumtochty Castle Preparatory School
People educated at St Leonards School
People from Aylsham
Scottish journalists
Scottish novelists
Scottish women novelists
Scottish women journalists